Squash at the 2011 Games of the Small States of Europe was held from 30 May – 6 June 2011.

Medal summary

Men

Women

Medal table

Men

Singles

Team

Women

Singles

Team

References
Squash Site of the 2011 Games of the Small States of Europe

2011 in squash
2011 Games of the Small States of Europe
2011